Simon Martin (born 1965) is a British artist living and working in London. Martin is known for his video works.

Early life
Martin was born in Cheshire, England in 1965. He attended the Slade School of Fine Art, University College London, between 1985 and 1989.

Career
In 2005 Martin showed his video work Wednesday Afternoon in solo exhibitions at White Columns, New York City, Counter Gallery, London and The Power Plant, Toronto. Reviewing the New York exhibition in the New York Times, Roberta Smith called the work a "a minor masterpiece of poetic discretion".  In 2011, his film Louis Ghost Chair, commissioned by the British organization Film and Video Umbrella, premiered at the Holbourne Museum in Bath, UK. His film Lemon 03 Generations (Turn it Around version) was presented as an outdoor projection by the Henry Moore museum in December 2014. In 2015 he presented his film UR Feeling in a solo show at the Camden Arts Centre. Known until this point for his films that used portrayed only static objects, UR Feeling was his first work to use human performers.

He was included in the 2006 Tate Triennial.

In 2008 he received the £45,000 Paul Hamlyn Foundation visual arts award.

Since 2005 he has worked with sound.

Collections
Martin's work is included in the permanent collections of the Dallas Museum of Art and the Tate Museum, London.

References

External links
 Official web site

1965 births
Living people
British sculptors
British male sculptors
British video artists
People from Cheshire
Alumni of the Slade School of Fine Art